Gradišnik is a Slovenian surname. Notable people with the surname include:

Ana Gradišnik (born 1996), Slovenian pool player
Branko Gradišnik (born 1951), Slovenian writer and translator
Janez Gradišnik (1917–2009), Slovenian author and translator

Slovene-language surnames